The January 2–4, 2014 North American blizzard was a major winter storm that affected much of the East Coast with snow, and frigid temperatures following the storm.

Meteorological synopsis 

Late on December 30, a weak clipper system moved southward from Canada. The system produced light snow in the Midwest around areas like Minneapolis, Minnesota with only light accumulations.

Starting on New Year's Day, however, the clipper began to strengthen and take an eastward turn. It would produce more moderate to heavy snow around areas like Cincinnati, Ohio, with accumulations of roughly 4-6 inches. The storm then continued to move eastwards towards the East Coast, where it would continue to intensify.

Early on January 2, the system started to become more complex as a new low pressure area had formed in the Gulf of Mexico along a stationary front. Winter storm warnings began to be issued by roughly mid-day from eastern New England to as far west as Pennsylvania as the storm closed in on the Northeast. By 3:00 p.m, the northern low began to weaken as the southern one began to take over as it continued to pull moisture from the Gulf of Mexico. This was the start of the storm's transition to a nor'easter.

Later that night, the low pressure began to strengthen off the Southeast coast and move out to sea as it dumped snow on its northwestern side over the Northeastern United States and New England. Snow continued to fall into the early hours of January 3 even as it pulled away from the coastline.

After it had left the coast early that morning, it continued to strengthen and turn to the northeast, and late on January 4, it reached its peak intensity of  while situated near Greenland. It was then absorbed into another extratropical cyclone, which later developed into Cyclone Christina which brought high winds to western Europe several days later.

Aftermath and cold wave 

After the storm passed, an arctic front associated with it passed through the region, bringing record cold temperatures in the eastern half of the United States.

Boxford, Massachusetts recorded . Over a dozen deaths were attributed to the cold wave, with dangerous roadway conditions and extreme cold cited as causes.

Evan Gold of weather intelligence firm Planalytics called the storm and the low temperatures the worst weather event for the economy since Hurricane Sandy just over a year earlier. 200 million people were affected, and Gold calculated the impact at $5 billion. $50 to $100 million was lost by airlines which cancelled a total of 20,000 flights after the storm began on January 2. JetBlue suffered because 80% of its flights go through New York City or Boston. Parents could not go to their offices and had to conduct remote work. Not included in the total were the insurance industry and government costs for salting roads, overtime and repairs.

See also 

Mid-February 2015 North American blizzard – A similar storm that brought record cold temperatures behind it in its wake.
March 2014 nor'easter
November 2014 North American cold wave
February 9–11, 2017 North American blizzard - A similar storm that produced similar snow totals in the same areas.

References 

Nor'easters
December 2013 events in the United States
January 2014 events in the United States
2013 natural disasters in the United States
2014 natural disasters in the United States
Natural disasters in Massachusetts